New Saeedabad Tehsil is an administrative subdivision, (Tehsil), of Matiari District in the Sindh province of Pakistan.

References

Matiari District
Talukas of Sindh